Herten can refer to:

Herten, a town in North Rhine-Westphalia, Germany.
Herten, a village in the southeast of the Netherlands
Herten, a small village in the northeast of Belgium, now part of Wellen
Herten in Frauenfeld, Switzerland
Herten, Rheinfelden, a village forming part of Rheinfelden, Germany.